The 1979 Crossley Carpets Trophy, also known as the Chichester International,  was a women's tennis tournament played on outdoor grass courts at Oaklands Park in Chichester in England. The event was part of the AA category of the 1979 Colgate Series. It was the ninth edition of the tournament and was held from 11 June through 17 June 1979. Fifth-seeded Evonne Goolagong Cawley won her second consecutive singles title at the event and earned $14,000 first-prize money.

Finals

Singles
 Evonne Goolagong Cawley defeated  Sue Barker 6–1, 6–4
It was Goolagong Cawley's 2nd singles title of the year and the 81st of her career.

Doubles
 Greer Stevens /  Wendy Turnbull defeated  Billie Jean King /  Martina Navratilova 6–3, 1–6, 7–5

Prize money

Notes

References

External links
 International Tennis Federation (ITF) tournament details

Crossley Carpets Trophy
Crossley Carpets Trophy
Crossley Carpets Trophy
Chichester Tennis Tournament